Ray Martínez (born October 9, 1950) is an American dance music icon, who was a musician, songwriter, and singer in the late 1970s and 1980s, and later became a record producer, engineer, and record label owner/executive. He is known within the industry for having helped originate what became known as the "Miami Sound", created out of a prominent independent record label of that era, TK Records. He used his innovative sound to create Paris International Records, his own independently owned label, which released multiple dance hits during the era.

Early years
Martínez was born in Cuba on October 9 to an American father and a Cuban mother. Although he and his family commuted between the United States and Cuba, Martínez permanently moved to Miami, Florida, at the age of ten. Having studied piano since the age of five, he graduated from Miami Dade Community College, and continued his higher education at Florida Atlantic University, majoring in Music and Business. He also pursued post-graduate courses.

At the age of sixteen, Martinez first became involved with music by playing in local bands. In 1973, while playing at The Seven Seas Lounge, a popular Miami night club, he was asked to join the band, Frankie Valli and the Four Seasons. This is where Martínez received his first taste of fame, and started getting involved in the music industry on multiple levels, not just as a performer.

Industry career
In 1975, Martínez returned to Miami and went to work at T.K. Records, where he learned his craft from Henry Stone. Starting out as a studio musician, Martinez stayed after hours, watching and learning. He became a recording engineer, later advancing to chief engineer, eventually producing most of the artists at T.K. He went on to produce hits for several small and large music labels worldwide.

Artistic career
At T.K., Martínez experimented with his flair for "Afro-Cuban" percussion, and mixed it with the R & B sound that T.K. was famous for to originate the "Miami Sound".

In 1978, he formed the studio group, Amant, which had disco hits with the tracks, "If There Is Love" and "Hazy Shades of Love". Both tracks peaked at number five on the disco chart. As an engineer/producer/artist, he was involved in many Billboard nationally charted records, several gold records worldwide, a Grammy nominee, and several Billboard Awards. In 2006, he was inducted into one of Europe's "Dance Music Halls Of Fame".

Executive career
At T.K., Martínez was influential in introducing the concept of the 12-inch record for promotional purposes. He founded and served as operating president of Paris International, a top independent label. Martínez taught seminars at the University of Miami in music business and production, and established many new promotion and distribution concepts that later became industry standards.

After retirement in the early 1990s, Martínez continued serving the music industry as a consultant for several music companies and entertainment attorneys. He also ran a family-owned real estate acquisition/investment company.

Paris Music Group
In 2006, Martínez decided to come out of retirement, and opened Paris Music Group.

References

1950 births
Living people
Cuban musicians